Notto be confused with politician Ernest Amos (Florida)

Ernest Amos (born 12 September 1975) is a former Motswana footballer who played for TASC and BDF XI in the Botswana Premier League as well as the Botswana national football team.

References

External links

1975 births
Living people
Botswana footballers
Botswana international footballers
Association football defenders